The HP-22S is an electronic calculator from the Hewlett-Packard company which is algebraic and scientific. This calculator is comparable to the HP-32S.  A solver was included instead of programming. It had the same constraints as the 32S, lacking enough RAM for serious use. Functions available include TVM and unit conversions. Only single letter variable names are allowed. Marketed as a student calculator, the 22S uses infix notation rather than the reverse polish notation used on some higher-end HP calculators of the same era.

Features 

The HP-22S includes many of the typical features found in most scientific calculators:
 Trigonometric and hyperbolic functions
 Polar/rectangular coordinate conversion
 Probability functions and statistical calculators (mean and standard deviation, weighted mean, linear regression)
 Unit and base conversions

Hardware 

The 22S has the same physical form factor and 37-key keypad as other models in the Pioneer series. Introduced simultaneously with the HP-32S, it is based on the same hardware, with a single line character-based dot matrix display that can display both numerical and alphabetical characters. The CPU is an HP Saturn Sacajawea chip clocked at 640 kHz, making it slower than its higher-spec cousin, the HP-27S.

Equation solving and equation library 

HP's advertising for the 22S emphasized the equation solver and library of built-in equations. This feature allows a multi-variable equation to be entered by the user, and the equation solved for a particular unknown variable given the value of other variables.

For convenience the 22S includes a set of common mathematical and scientific formulae, including:
 Quadratic roots
 Kinetic energy
 Ideal gas law
 Fluid pressure
 Radioactive decay
 Time value of money

See also
 List of Hewlett-Packard products: Pocket calculators
 HP calculators

References

External links
HP-22S on MyCalcDB (database about 1970s and 1980s pocket calculators)

22S
22S
1988 introductions